Karen Sheila Gillan (born 28 November 1987) is a Scottish actress. She gained recognition for her work in British film and television, particularly for playing Amy Pond, a primary companion to the Eleventh Doctor in the science fiction series Doctor Who (2010–2013), for which she received several awards and nominations. Her early film roles include Ally in the thriller film Outcast (2010) and Jane Lockhart in the romantic comedy film Not Another Happy Ending (2013). She also worked on the stage while in Britain, appearing in John Osborne's play Inadmissible Evidence (2011).

Gillan made her transition to Hollywood starring as Kaylie Russell in the horror film Oculus (2013), her first commercial success in the United States, and thereafter played the lead in the ABC sitcom Selfie (2014). She achieved international stardom for portraying Nebula in the Marvel Cinematic Universe superhero films Guardians of the Galaxy (2014), Guardians of the Galaxy Vol. 2 (2017), Avengers: Infinity War (2018), Avengers: Endgame (2019), and Thor: Love and Thunder (2022); she will reprise the role in the upcoming film Guardians of the Galaxy Vol. 3 (2023). She additionally was praised for her portrayals of Ruby Roundhouse in the action films Jumanji: Welcome to the Jungle (2017) and Jumanji: The Next Level (2019), Sam in the comedy film Gunpowder Milkshake (2021) and her double role in the sci-fi thriller film Dual (2022).

Gillan's accolades include an Empire Award, a National Television Award, a Teen Choice Award and nominations for a British Academy Scotland Film Award, a Critics' Choice Award and a Saturn Award. Aside from acting, she garnered critical acclaim for her involvement as writer and director in the drama film The Party's Just Beginning (2018), which she also headlined. She has been noted for her public image and activism, particularly towards suicide prevention.

Early life
Karen Sheila Gillan was born in Inverness on 28 November 1987, the daughter of Marie and Raymond John Gillan. Her father is from Sunderland in North East England. Although she comes from a Catholic background, she says that she was not baptised and does not practise a religion.

When she turned 16, she moved to Edinburgh and completed a HNC Acting and Performance course at Telford College. She moved to London at age 18 to study at the Italia Conti Academy of Theatre Arts. While there, she was scouted by a modelling agency. Prior to her acting career, she worked as a model, premiering at London Fashion Week in 2007. Gillan has said she would not give up her acting career to return to modelling, stating that while she enjoyed modelling, acting had always been her main interest and goal.

Career

2006–2012: British film and television 
Gillan's early television acting career included guest appearances on several television shows, with her first role being in an episode of ITV crime drama Rebus, a role for which she had to drop out of school.

Gillan undertook a two-year stint as a member of the ensemble cast of the sketch comedy series The Kevin Bishop Show, in which she played multiple characters including celebrities such as Katy Perry  and Angelina Jolie. Gillan also appeared on TV in a leading role in a horror project entitled The Well, which was broadcast as a series of episodic short films on BBC Two and later as a web series on BBC.co.uk. Part of the BBC's multimedia "switch" programming, the short episodes interconnect with online games that further explore the environments presented in the series. In 2008, she starred in the Channel 4 television film Stacked.
Gillan went on to portray Amy Pond, companion to the Eleventh Doctor (portrayed by Matt Smith), on the British sci-fi series Doctor Who. Before being cast in the role in May 2009, she had previously appeared on Doctor Who in Series 4 episode "The Fires of Pompeii" in the role of a soothsayer. She made her first on-screen appearance as Amy in "The Eleventh Hour" with her cousin Caitlin Blackwood portraying a younger version of the same character. In 2010, she won in the Entertainment category at the Young Scot Awards. She appeared in the sixth series in 2011 and the first five episodes of the seventh series in 2012, after which her character and Rory Williams (portrayed by Arthur Darvill) left the series. Gillan reprised her role in the 2013 Christmas special "The Time of the Doctor", to coincide with Smith's departure as the Doctor.

In 2011, Gillan made her first theatre appearance playing the role of Shirley in John Osborne's play Inadmissible Evidence along with Douglas Hodge. The play debuted at the Donmar Warehouse on 16 October 2011. After making an appearance in Outcast, it was announced that Gillan would star in an indie Scottish romantic comedy called Not Another Happy Ending alongside Emun Elliott in August 2011. She was selected by director John McKay because he came to know her during the production of We'll Take Manhattan, which he also directed, as "a very bubbly, vibrant, energetic, funny, slightly clumsy person" who was a perfect fit for the character. Filming took place in July 2012, though Elliott was replaced by Stanley Weber. Gillan told journalists that she was happy to be involved in a Scottish production that "isn't about drug use or fighting the English". The film premiered at the Edinburgh International Film Festival in June 2013.

In 2012, Gillan appeared in the television film We'll Take Manhattan playing the part of supermodel Jean Shrimpton, which told the story of Shrimpton's relationship with the photographer David Bailey.

2013–present: Breakthrough in Hollywood 

In November 2013, Gillan appeared on Broadway in a play called Time to Act, one of the plays included in "The 24 Hour Plays on Broadway" to benefit the non-profit Urban Arts Partnership. She was also cast in the third season of A Touch of Cloth, which was co-created by Charlie Brooker. Gillan joined the regular cast of Adult Swim's NTSF:SD:SUV:: for the show's third season in 2013. Gillan starred in the lead role in the supernatural horror movie Oculus, which was filmed in Alabama and premiered at the 2013 Toronto International Film Festival. Her performance received praise, and she earned a Fright Meter Award nomination for Best Actress.In February 2014, Gillan was cast as the lead in Selfie, an American single-camera sitcom for ABC produced by Warner Bros. Television which was greenlit for the 2014–15 US television season. Gillan played a socialite named Eliza Dooley, a modern-day take on Eliza Doolittle, who is obsessed with social media. This was Gillan's first time in the lead role of an American television series. The series was cancelled by ABC on 7 November 2014 after seven episodes; the remaining six episodes were made available on Hulu starting 25 November 2014. Selfie still has a dedicated following of fans years after its broadcast especially in China. In May 2013, Gillan was cast as Nebula in the Marvel superhero science fiction film Guardians of the Galaxy, which was released in August 2014. Gillan had her head shaved bald for the role, which Marvel turned into the wig that Gillan wore during the production of Selfie. In May 2014, Gillan was cast in the Western film In a Valley of Violence directed by Ti West, opposite John Travolta, Ethan Hawke and Taissa Farmiga. Gillan portrayed Ellen, the older sister to Farmiga's character.

In 2015, Gillan had a bit part in the drama film The Big Short directed by Adam McKay, alongside Brad Pitt, Christian Bale, Ryan Gosling, Steve Carell and Melissa Leo. She wrote and directed her first short film, Coward, which screened at the 2015 Edinburgh Film Festival, and was nominated for several awards. Later in the year she wrote, directed, and starred in another short film called Conventional. She won in the Best Female Newcomer category at the 20th Empire Awards for Guardians of the Galaxy and Oculus. In the same year, she was cast in an HBO pilot titled, The Devil You Know.

On 2 November 2016, it was announced that Gillan would write, direct and star in her directorial feature film debut with Burbank-based development and production company Mt. Hollywood Films' indie drama project titled Tupperware Party. Set in her home city of Inverness in the Scottish Highlands, filming began in January 2017 and wrapped in the following month. The title of the film was later changed to The Party's Just Beginning. The film was nominated for Best Feature Film at the British Academy Scotland Awards.

In 2017, Gillan reprised her role as Nebula in Guardians of the Galaxy Vol. 2, this time becoming a member of the film's eponymous team, and co-starred in The Circle, alongside Emma Watson, Tom Hanks, and John Boyega. The latter film, released in April, was directed and written by James Ponsoldt, and was based on the novel by Dave Eggers. Also in that year, Gillan played the lead female role, Ruby Roundhouse, in Jumanji: Welcome to the Jungle, the third instalment of the Jumanji franchise, starring alongside Dwayne Johnson, Kevin Hart, Jack Black and Nick Jonas. She reprised her role as Nebula in Avengers: Infinity War (2018) and Avengers: Endgame (2019), which were filmed back-to-back. Filming for the two films began in January 2017 at Pinewood Atlanta Studios in Fayette County, Georgia and ended in January 2018.

In 2019, aside from her leading role in Avengers: Endgame, she co-starred in the films Stuber and Spies in Disguise, and starred in All Creatures Here Below. Also in 2019, she reprised her role as Ruby Roundhouse in Jumanji: The Next Level and appeared in a short film titled, Neurotica. In 2020, she appeared in the adventure drama The Call of the Wild, based on the Jack London novel. In 2021, Gillan starred in the action film Gunpowder Milkshake alongside Lena Headey, Angela Bassett, Carla Gugino, Michelle Yeoh and Paul Giamatti. For the role, she was nominated for the Best Actress in an Action Movie at the 2nd Critics' Choice Super Awards.

In 2022, she starred in the sci-fi thriller Dual alongside Aaron Paul, which is filmed entirely in Tampere, Finland. She played a double role, and earned acclaim for her performance. Critic consensus from review aggregator Rotten Tomatoes described the movie as "well-led", and John DeFore for The Hollywood Reporter said that "Gillan, who has spent much of her post-Doctor Who decade playing cyborgs, computer avatars and a thinly imagined assassin, has a barely more human role to play here; to the extent that she makes either Sarah worth rooting for, it's an achievement." In 2023 she appeared in Late Bloomers, and started filming Sleeping Dogs in Australia with Russell Crowe.

Philanthropy 
In 2011, Gillan helped promote Fashion Targets Breast Cancer (FTBC) and the opening of Squirrel Ward at the Great Ormond Street Hospital in London. Gillan has also voiced advertisements for eHarmony and The Royal Bank of Scotland. She also appeared in TV on the Radio's "Happy Idiot" music video, released on 3 October 2014.

In 2018, she visited the Mikeysline crisis support centre in Inverness after presenting her film The Party's Just Beginning. The film is about the high suicide rate in the Scottish Highlands, and Gillan made a public pledge to support the mental health charity. In September 2020, the Inverness Courier reported that a student from Inverness was selected in a competition inspired by The Party's Just Beginning to go to New York Fashion Week, held by Mikeysline and Fashion Week Online, in a contest meant to create awareness for World Suicide Prevention Day.

Personal life
During a 2012 interview on The Late Late Show with Craig Ferguson, Gillan stated that she had permanently relocated to the U.S. around the time she was shooting the film Oculus (2013).

In May 2022, Gillan married Nick Kocher, an American comedian of the sketch duo BriTANicK, in a ceremony at Castle Toward, in Dunoon, Scotland.

Awards and nominations

References

External links

 

1987 births
Living people
People from Inverness
Scottish expatriates in the United States
Scottish people of English descent
Scottish people of Irish descent
Anglo-Scots
Former Roman Catholics
Alumni of the Italia Conti Academy of Theatre Arts
21st-century Scottish actresses
Scottish female models
Scottish film actresses
Scottish television actresses
Scottish voice actresses